Frank Durand (March 9, 1895 – June 15, 1978) was an American politician who served in the New Jersey General Assembly from 1930 to 1931 and in the New Jersey Senate from 1933 to 1938.

References

1895 births
1978 deaths
Majority leaders of the New Jersey Senate
Republican Party members of the New Jersey General Assembly
Republican Party New Jersey state senators
People from Asbury Park, New Jersey
Presidents of the New Jersey Senate
20th-century American politicians